Bucksbaum is a German surname meaning box tree. Notable people with the surname include:

John Bucksbaum (born c. 1957), American businessman
Martin Bucksbaum (c. 1920-1995), American businessman
Matthew Bucksbaum (1926–2013), American businessman
Melva Bucksbaum (1933–2015), American art collector, curator and patron of the arts
Philip H. Bucksbaum (born 1953), American physicist

See also
Buxbaum
Buchsbaum

Jewish surnames